The Chow Chow is a spitz-type of dog breed originally from northern China. The Chow Chow is a sturdily built dog, square in profile, with a broad skull and small, triangular, erect ears with rounded tips. The breed is known for a very dense double coat that is either smooth or rough. The fur is particularly thick in the neck area, giving it a distinctive ruff or mane appearance. The coat may be shaded/self-red, black, blue, cinnamon/fawn, or cream.

History 

The Chow Chow has been identified as a basal breed that predates the emergence of the modern breeds in the 19th Century. One writer proposed that the Chow Chow originated in China 2,000 years ago or possibly originated in Arctic Asia 3,000 years ago which migrated to Mongolia, then to China.

One Chinese legend mentions large war dogs from Central Asia that resembled black-tongued lions. One Chinese ruler was said to own 5,000 Chows. The Chinese also used Chows to pull dog sleds through swampy terrain, and this was remarked upon by Marco Polo.

Today, the American Kennel Club registers approximately 10,000 Chow Chows a year. The Canadian Kennel Club registers approximately 350.

Appearance 

The Chow Chow is a sturdily built dog, square in profile, with a broad skull and small, triangular, erect ears with rounded tips. The breed is known for a very dense double coat that is either smooth or rough. The fur is particularly thick in the neck area, giving it a distinctive ruff or mane appearance. The coat may be shaded/self-red, black, blue, cinnamon/fawn, or cream.
Not all these color varieties are recognized as valid in all countries. Individuals with patchy or multicolored coats are considered to be outside the breed standard.  
Chow Chow eyes are typically deep set and almond shaped. The breed is unique by their purple/blue-black tongue which no other breed has except Shar Pei, and has very straight hind legs, resulting in a rather stilted gait. The bluish color extends to the Chow Chow's lips; this is the only dog breed with this distinctive bluish color in its lips and oral cavity (other dogs have black or a piebald pattern skin in their mouths). Another distinctive feature is the curly tail. It has thick hair and lies curled on its back. The nose should be black, but blue-coated Chow Chow can have a solid blue or slate-colored nose. According to the American Kennel Club breed standards, any other tone is not acceptable for contests. FCI countries, however, do allow a self-colored nose in the cream.

The blue-black/purple tongue gene appears to be dominant, as most mixed breed dogs that come from a Chow Chow retain that tongue color. However, the blue-black/purple tongue can also be found on the Shar Pei. This is not to say that every mixed breed dog with spots of purple on the tongue is descended from Chow Chow, as purple spots on the tongue can be found on other purebred dogs.

Temperament 
Most commonly kept as pets, Chow Chows tend to display discernment of strangers and can become fiercely protective of their owners and property. The American Kennel Club standards, however, consider an all-too aggressive or all-too timid Chow Chow to be unacceptable. For that reason, some owners have attributed a cat-like personality to the Chow Chow.

Chow Chow are not excessively active, meaning that they can be housed in an apartment. However, a Chow Chow living in an apartment will need daily exercise to prevent restlessness and boredom. Upon realizing that exercise is a daily occurrence, Chow Chow will tend to be more assertive with owners in anticipation of such activities.

This breed of dog has many strong loyal bonds with friends and family, but the Chow Chow dog is usually overly protective of one or two main family members. It is in the breed's nature to be quiet and well-behaved, but it is also resistant to training. Chow Chows become very stubborn and attach to certain individuals as they age. This makes training them when they are puppies crucial, because they gain respect for those who care for them.

To avoid aggression and over-protectiveness as an adult, continuous socialization as early as possible could allow the dog to adjust. When a Chow Chow reaches adolescence it rejects authority from any owner who failed to earn its admiration. Aggression can be one distinctive behavioural characteristic in this breed, though while some are of an aggressive nature, many are known to be easy-going in nature – sometimes adopting an aloof disposition to individuals other than their owners. Aggression when it does appear is often towards other dogs of the same gender, especially Chows. Due to their strong hunting instincts, it is recommended that these dogs stay fenced, leashed, and away from cats and small dogs. This is why it is crucial that they are socialized early and consistently to act appropriately with strangers. 
At first, Chow Chows are very hesitant in interacting with strangers. However, this problem can be avoided if the owners train the Chow Chow at a young age.

Owning a Chow Chow can raise the cost of homeowners insurance because some companies consider them high-risk dogs. In a study in the Journal of the American Veterinary Medical Association, Chow Chow were responsible for 8 out of 238 fatalities related to dog bites from 1979 to 1998.

Colors

Health 
The Chow Chow can suffer from entropion, glaucoma, juvenile cataracts, lymphoma, hip dysplasia, diabetes mellitus, canine pemphigus, and gastric cancer. Chow Chows are a high risk breed for autoimmune disease and are at a predisposition for skin melanoma.

Grooming 
Chow breed will heavily shed their fur in the seasons of spring and autumn, which requires more grooming attention than other seasons. It is important that owners use the correct tool to avoid harming the skin and facilitate grooming. Three kinds of brushes that owners can use on their Chow Chow are a medium-coarse brush for the larger parts of the body, a slick brush for smaller areas, and a pin brush to maintain the longer strands of hair. Chow Chows are known to have either short and smooth coat, or a rougher and longer coat. Both create a thick woolly layer, as it gets closer to the skin. They should be brushed four times a week; however shedding seasons may require daily grooming. Also, a spray conditioner can help avoiding breakage and tearing to the thick coat of hair. Lastly, a monthly bath is required to avoid fleas and keep a clean coat of fur.

Notable owners 

Konrad Lorenz, an Austrian zoologist, ethologist, and ornithologist, winner of the 1973 Nobel Prize in Physiology or Medicine, who is often regarded as one of the founders of modern ethology, had a Chow Chow mix named Stasi. He wrote about his dogs in his book King Solomon's Ring.

Georgia O'Keeffe, an American artist, owned at least 6 Chow Chows in her lifetime. O'Keeffe wrote about her dogs in letters to friends and family, took photographs of them, and sketched them. She was a member of The Chow Chow Club, Inc. and kept various veterinary papers, club notifications, feeding schedules, and correspondence relating to her dogs.

Sigmund Freud had a Chow Chow named Jo-Fi Ling who attended all of his therapy sessions because he felt that dogs had a special sense that allows them to judge a person's character accurately, and admitted he depended on Jo-Fi for an assessment of a patient's mental state.

U.S. Navy admiral George Dewey acquired a Chow Chow in Hong Kong in 1898 and named it Bob. Bob rarely left the admiral's side and had the run of the cruiser . Bob died in 1899 due to eating chocolates given to Dewey by well-wishers upon Olympias arrival in New York City.

Martha Stewart owns several Chows, which are frequently seen on Martha's shows. One of them is named Genghis Khan.

President Calvin Coolidge and his wife owned a black Chow named Timmy.

Elvis Presley and his girlfriend Linda Thompson had a Chow Chow named Getlow.

Vanna Bonta had a cream Chow Chow named Sky, a blue Chow Chow named Seraph, and a red Chow Chow named Beowulf, who was immortalized as a fictional dog in the book Flight.

Janet Jackson had a Chow Chow named Buckwheat.

Italian footballer Mario Balotelli bought his girlfriend two Chow Chow puppies in the UK.

Walt Disney and his wife, Lillian Disney, had a Chow Chow named Sunnee. It was the couple's first dog. Allegedly, Walt gifted Lilly the Chow Chow inside a hat box, which inspired the scene on Lady and the Tramp where Lady is gifted in the same way.

K-Pop artist Park Junhee has a Chow Chow named Lion.

Youtuber Miniminter has a Chow Chow named Mushu, with his fiancé Talia Mar.

See also 

 Dogs portal
 List of dog breeds
 Eurasier, a dog-breed created through crossing Chow Chow, Wolfspitz and Samoyed dog

References

External links 

 

FCI breeds
Dog breeds originating in China
Spitz breeds